Alfa Planetarium was a planetarium located in Monterrey, Nuevo León, Mexico. This institution was created by ALFA (Mexico) in 1978 to promote science and technology in Latin America. It included an interactive science museum, an Omnimax system cinema, an aviary and an area for temporary exhibits and events. The Alfa Planetarium was one of the most visited cultural centers in Mexico. While its main focus was on science, it also had some art pieces.

It closed it doors in definitively in the 4th of September 2020, after 42 years of running. To the dismay of many people. The main reason stated for the closing of the museum was the rapidly advancing technology, which left the museum to become obsolete. As such they decided to close it, before it wouldn't be a matter of choice. During its entire run, it is thought to have had over 14 million visitors. By the end of its life it had over 500 pieces in its permanent exhibitions.

History 
It was inaugurated in October of 1978, under its initial name of "Centro Cultural Alfa" translating to Cultural Center Alfa. In its inauguration the then Secretary of Education, Fernando Solana Morales and the then president of the ALFA Group Bernardo Garza Sada where present. By all means it was a revolutionary museum for the whole of Latin America.

In 2014 it was also visited by King Charles of Gales and by his wife Queen Camilla. Where they met with the top companies of Nuevo Leon, and the Secretary of Economy.

Additions 

 In 1986 the Aviary was opened, being the first of its type in the whole country. It was composed of 25 different species, with over 200 specimens. 
 In 1988 the "Pabellón El Universo" was opened, it had a stained glass monument called "El Universo" (English: The Universe), made by Rufino Tamayo. Though in 2017 this area would get burned, and the building was demolished a year later. With the stained glass being transferred to the Alfa offices. 
 In 1994 the science garden was opened. With the objective of kids interacting and playing with the various games, where they would learn the various physics phenomena. It also had 14 exact replicas of pre hispanic monuments. 
 In 1998 a public observatory was opened, it was considered the biggest public observatory of all of Mexico. It also had an Auditory, which was used for conference and events.

Architecture 
It was designed by Fernando Garza, Samuel Weiffberg y Efraín Alemán. Its dome is 40 meters in diameter, and 34 meters high. It also has 63 degrees of inclination. It was made with Reinforced Concrete, and its structure is meant to resemble a telescope looking out towards the horizon.

Gallery

References

External links
Official website 
Alfa website

Museums established in 1978
Planetaria in Mexico
Science museums in Mexico
Museums in Nuevo León
Aviaries
Buildings and structures in Monterrey
Tourist attractions in Monterrey
Articles needing infobox zoo